Adamberger is a surname. Notable people with the surname include:

Antonie Adamberger (1790–1867), Austrian stage actress
Maria Anna Adamberger (1752–1804), Austrian actress
Valentin Adamberger (1740–1804), German operatic singer